Róbert Kovácsevics (born 19 March 1979 in Sellye) is a Hungarian football player who currently plays for Drogheda United F.C.

He signed for Drogheda in March 2011 and made his League of Ireland debut in a 4–0 loss to Shamrock Rovers on 1 April .

References
Player profile at HLSZ 

1979 births
Living people
People from Sellye
Hungarian footballers
Association football defenders
Pécsi MFC players
Marcali VFC footballers
Kaposvári Rákóczi FC players
Drogheda United F.C. players
League of Ireland players
Sportspeople from Baranya County